Angama may refer to:

Culture 
 Angama (dance), a traditional dance in the Yaeyama Islands of Japan

Places
Angama River, a river of the Republic of the Congo
Angama, Niari, Republic of the Congo
Angara, Plateaux, Republic of the Congo
Angama, Democratic Republic of the Congo
Angama, Chad, a sandy hilly area of Chad